Acraea periphanes is a butterfly in the family Nymphalidae which is native to the southern subtropics of Africa.

Range
It is found in northern Zambia, Malawi, southern and western Tanzania, the southern Democratic Republic of the Congo (Haut-Lomami, Lualaba, Haut-Shaba) and Angola.

Description

A. periphanes Oberth. (55 b). With this species begin the forms in which discal dot 4 of the hindwing is placed nearer to the distal margin than discal dots 3 and 5; in having the veins of both wings black towards the distal margin it approximates to A. atolmis and differs from the following species; the discal dot in 5 of the hindwing is nearly always absent and the one in cellule 4 of the forewing is placed somewhat more distally than those in 3, 5 and 6, which stand in a straight line. In the type-form the forewing above has a black apical spot 6 to 7 mm. in breadth and the hindwing a marginal band 1.5 to 2 mm. in breadth, which is usually light-spotted above also; the upperside of the forewing is not, and that of the hindwing but little darkened at the base. The female has often a darkened or whitish ground-colour. Rhodesia, southern Congo and Nyassaland. 
 f. beni Baker only differs in the absence of the black apical spot on the forewing above. Angola and Rhodesia. 
 f. acritoides Eltr. The apical spot on the upperside of the forewing is absent or is only 2 mm. in breadth and the discal dots in 3 to 6 of the forewing are entirely absent; wings above not darkened at the base; marginal band of the hindwing as in the type-form; through the absence of discal dots 3 to 6 of the forewing this form becomes very similar to A. acrita (55 b), from which it only differs in the black veins of the forewing. Rhodesia. 
 f. umida Wichgr. differs from the preceding in having the upperside of the wings darkened at the base and in that of the hindwing having a deep black, unspotted marginal band 3 to 4 mm. in breadth; the apical spot of the forewing is absent or only moderately developed. Rhodesia. 
 f. melaina Eltr. (59 f) has the apical spot on the upperside of the forewing 6 to 7 mm. in breadth and only gradually narrowed posteriorly, a very broad, unspotted marginal band on the upperside of the hindwing and the base of the wings darker above. Rhodesia.

Biology
The habitat consists of marshy grassland.

Taxonomy
It is a member of the Acraea cepheus species group. See also Pierre & Bernaud, 2014

References

External links

Die Gross-Schmetterlinge der Erde 13: Die Afrikanischen Tagfalter. Plate XIII 55 b
Die Gross-Schmetterlinge der Erde 13: Die Afrikanischen Tagfalter. Plate XIII 59 f melaina
Images representing Acraea periphanes at Bold.

Butterflies described in 1893
periphanes
Butterflies of Africa